Whaling City Sound is an independent jazz record label established by Neal Weiss in 1999.

History
Weiss is president of Fiber Optic Center in New Bedford, Massachusetts. A lifelong fan of jazz, he started Whaling City Sound as a jazz label, though he has dabbled in other genres such as blues and classical. The first acts to sign were both from New Bedford, pianist John Harrison and vocalist Marcelle Gauvin, who recorded the first album in the catalog. Gerry Gibbs, the son of jazz vibraphonist Terry Gibbs, fulfilled a dream when he formed the Thrasher Dream Trio with bassist Ron Carter and pianist Kenny Barron and released an album in 2013. Other musicians who have recorded for Whaling City Sound include guitarist Joe Beck, saxophonist Dave Liebman, and saxophonist Greg Abate.

Roster

 Greg Abate
 John Abercrombie
 Thierry Arpino
 Danny Bacher
 Dave Bass
 Sheryl Bailey
 Kenny Barron
 Joe Beck
 Jerry Bergonzi
 Ramona Borthwick
 Don Braden
 Ron Carter
 Paul Cienniwa
 Joey DeFrancesco
 Santi Dibriano
 Miles Donahue
 Marcelle Gauvin
 Bruce Gertz
 Gerry Gibbs
 Terry Gibbs
 Dino Govoni
 Eric Hargett
 Monika Herzig
 Ingrid Jensen
 Steve Kirby
 Steve Langone
 Dave Liebman
 Alma Micic
 Rale Micic
 Jason Miles
 Marcus Monteiro
 Shawnn Monteiro
 Dan Moretti
 Greg Murphy
 Hilary Noble
 Jay Rodriguez
 Harvie S
 Kristen Lee Sergeant
 Mark T. Small
 John Stein
 Michael Stephans
 Clark Terry
 Alon Yavnai
 Reggie Young
 Dave Zinno

References

Jazz record labels
Record labels established in 1999
1999 establishments in Massachusetts